Supernova is the 1999 debut album by the Chilean pop teen trio Supernova, at the time consisting of Constanza "Coni" Lewin, Elisa Montes and Consuelo "Chi-K" Edwards.

The album sold over 40,000 copies. It was certified Gold (for sales of over 15,000 units) and Platinum (for sales of over 25,000 units) in Chile.

Track listing

References 

1999 albums
Supernova (Chilean band) albums
Sony BMG albums